The National Ballet Theater of Puerto Rico is one of the leading ballet companies in Puerto Rico.

It was formed by former members of Ballet Concierto de Puerto Rico after the company was paralyzed by a dancers' strike in 2004.  They performed for the first time in April 2005 at the Francisco Arriví Theater in San Juan under the direction of Miguel Campaneria.

The company is located in the city of Guaynabo.

Company
As of May 2010:

Principal dancers

 José Rodríguez
 Laura Valentín

Soloists

 Lara Berríos
 Odemar Ocasio

Corps de ballet

 Miguel Cáez  
 Francesca García
 Saori Kawasaki
 Luis Martínez
 Elmer Pérez
 Daniel Ramírez
 Tatiana Rodríguez
 Omar Román
 Carolina Wolf

References

External links
 Official Balleteatro Nacional de Puerto Rico (National Ballet Theater of Puerto Rico)  website—

Dance in Puerto Rico
Ballet companies in the United States
Entertainment companies of Puerto Rico
Guaynabo, Puerto Rico
American companies established in 2005
Performing groups established in 2005
2005 establishments in Puerto Rico